The Horoghiuca is a right tributary of the river Miletin in Romania. It flows into the Miletin in Coșula.

References

Rivers of Romania
Rivers of Botoșani County